The 2014 Honkbal Hoofdklasse season began Thursday, April 17.

Standings

References

Honkbal Hoofdklasse
2014 in baseball
2014 in Dutch sport